Phil Ross (May 23, 1962 - August 20, 2020) had one of the greatest single seasons in college baseball history.  For the 1985 season he set, tied, or entered the NCAA record books 8 times while playing first base for Saint Leo University (Saint Leo College at the time).  Five of the 8 records still stand over 35 years later.

A few of his biggest feats, a .484 batting average, 1.8 RBIs per game (he had 90 in 50 games), and 22 HRs, including 2 Grand Slams in one inning.

While the NCAA does not presently keep official records of On-base plus slugging (OPS), by comparison, Ross's 1.607 OPS is 13% higher than the 1.422 of Major League Baseball single season OPS record holder Barry Bonds (set in 2004).

1985 Season Statistics

In the highly competitive Division II Sunshine State Conference, in which Saint Leo played, Ross was the first player to win the triple crown (Batting Average, HRs, and RBIs). The Sunshine State Conference has had 14 NCAA Division II College World Series champions since 1968.

Ross’ performance in 1985 earned him 1st Team All-Sunshine State Conference, 1st Team All-South, and 1st Team All-American (the only unanimous choice that year).

His excellence was remarkable in that the prior season for Saint Leo he hit .313 with only 8 HRs and 38 RBIs in 59 games (he was 2nd Team All-Conference at 1st Base).  His turnaround was largely attributable to first-year Saint Leo head baseball coach and legendary Major League Baseball pitcher Mike Marshall (baseball pitcher).  Marshall trusted on Ross team captain responsibility and made numerous refinements to his batting stance and swing.

At 6’2” and 215 lbs. Ross was an imposing and strong figure.  Marshall, who played Major League Baseball from 1967 to 1981, commented that “there was only one player stronger than Ross” he had ever seen or played against; and “it was Willie Stargell.”

Of Ross’ 22 HRs, 16 were with men on base, 3 were leadoff solo HRs.  He hit 2 HRs in a game 3 times.  His slugging percentage was .962; his on-base percentage was .645.  He had 53 walks in 50 games.  In the 19 games in which he hit his 22 HRs, his batting average was .623 with 67 RBIs (3.5 RBI per game).

He only struck out 15 times in 248 plate appearances (an average of 6 strikeouts per 100 plate appearances).  He scored 79 times, 1.58 times per game.

As a first baseman Ross was near perfect.  The left-hander made only 6 errors in 516 total plays for a .988 fielding percentage.

2 Grand Slams in One Inning
On March 18, 1985, in a home game against Division I Florida A&M, Ross went 3–4, including 2 Grand Slams in the second inning, a stand up double (a lined shot off the center field fence) with the bases loaded in the 4th inning, and he reached 1st base on a fielders choice in the 1st inning.  He scored 4 times in 4 plate appearances, and had 11 RBIs.  In a measure of professionalism and an acknowledgement of the incredible accomplishment on the afternoon, Coach Marshall removed Ross from the game to a standing ovation to teammates and fans on hand after Ross fielded a grounder in the top of the 4th inning.  Ross was featured that evening on CNN Sports by anchor Jim Huber.

Ross was 1 of 3 seniors on a Saint Leo team that went 22-26-2 (4-20 in Sunshine State Conference play).  The previous year Ross started at 1st base on a Saint Leo team that started 7 seniors, was ranked 5th in the nation in the final regular season Collegiate Baseball Poll, and went 46-13 (17-11 in Conference play, and 13-1 vs. Division I schools), and tied for the second most wins in the nation in Division II during the regular season.

In Ross’ final game of his college career, at home versus Conference rival Eckerd College, Ross hit a home run in his last at-bat. While rounding third base, in an incredible show of sportsmanship, the Eckerd players emptied the dugout and shook hands with Ross before he reached home plate.

Mysteriously Ross was not drafted that summer in the Major League Baseball draft and never attempted to try out for a major league club.

Ross was inducted into the Sunshine State Conference Hall of Fame in the class of 1992–93. In the Conference he is #1 in career batting average, #1 in slugging percentage, and 3rd in RBIs.

Ross was inducted into the Saint Leo Athletic Hall of Fame in 1993.

NCAA Division II Records

External links
NCAA baseball records book
Sunshine State Conference biography

1962 births
Living people
Saint Leo Lions baseball players
American baseball players